Erika Stefani (born 18 July 1971) is an Italian lawyer and politician who served as the Italian Minister of Regional Affairs and Autonomies from 1 June 2018 to 5 September 2019 and as the Italian Minister for Disabilities since 13 February 2021. A member of Lega Nord, she has served as a member of the Italian Senate since 15 March 2013.

Biography
Stefani originally became involved in politics when she stood as a candidate for councillor in the comune of Trissino, in 1999, winning the election. She subsequently joined Lega Nord, and was reelected as councillor in 2009 on the Lega Nord party list. During her latter term, she also served as deputy mayor of Trissino and as councillor for urban planning.

In the Italian general election of 2013, she stood as her party's candidate for the Italian Senate for the constituency of Veneto, and won; she was reelected in the 2018 election for the constituency of Vicenza.

On 1 June 2018, Stefani was sworn in as the Minister of Regional Affairs and Autonomies. She served until 5 September 2019.

On 13 February 2021, Stefani was appointed as the Italian Minister for Disabilities.

See also
 Conte Cabinet

References

External links
 

Living people
Politicians of Veneto
Venetist politicians
Italian women lawyers
Women government ministers of Italy
Conte I Cabinet
Draghi Cabinet
Lega Nord politicians
Senators of Legislature XVII of Italy
Senators of Legislature XVIII of Italy
Senators of Legislature XIX of Italy
University of Padua alumni
People from the Province of Vicenza
21st-century Italian lawyers
21st-century Italian women politicians
People from Valdagno
21st-century women lawyers
20th-century Italian women
Women members of the Senate of the Republic (Italy)
1971 births